Table tennis at the 2009 Asian Youth Games was held from 30 June to 6 July 2009 in the Toa Payoh Sports Hall in Singapore.

Medalists

Medal table

Results

Boys' singles

Girls' singles

Mixed doubles

Mixed team

1st stage
1–2 July

Group A

Group B

Group C

Group D

Knockout stage

References
 Official site
 Singapore Table Tennis Association

2009 Asian Youth Games events
2009 in table tennis
2009